Clarence is a 1988 BBC situation comedy starring Ronnie Barker and Josephine Tewson, written by Ronnie Barker under the pseudonym "Bob Ferris" as an acknowledgement to Dick Clement and Ian La Frenais, creators of Porridge. It was Barker's final sitcom appearance before his retirement.

Barker stars as Clarence Sale, a short-sighted furniture shifter. The series was inspired by "The Removals Person" by Hugh Leonard, an episode in the 1971 LWT comedy anthology series, Six Dates With Barker. The pilot episode has the same plot and a very similar script, even to the extent of Tewson reprising her earlier role. The only significant difference is that in "The Removals Person" Barker's character is named Fred.

Only one series of Clarence was made, which is now available on DVD. The series is also available in Region 4 Australia with the same cover art. The house of Jane Travers, which inspired the opening titles, is located on Malvern Road in Cheltenham.

Plot

In 1937, on the day of King George VI's coronation, Clarence Sale, a myopic removal man is clearing the house of a snooty upper-class lady who is moving abroad. There, he meets Jane Travers, her maid. The pair are mutually attracted and soon Clarence proposes to her. Jane decides that they should have a trial period of living together in a small cottage she has been given in an inheritance to see if they are compatible, with a bolster in the bed to preserve her chastity. The series followed this unconventional relationship, as well as Clarence's attempts at his furniture-moving profession.

Cast

Ronnie Barker as Clarence Sale
Josephine Tewson as Jane Travers
Phyllida Law as Mrs Vaile (Ep. 1)
Julia Deakin as Angela (Ep. 1)
Richard Caldicot as Cinema Manager (Ep. 2)
Gwen Nelson as Mrs Titheridge (Ep. 6)
Damaris Hayman as Lady in Loo (Ep. 6)

DVD releases 

In Australia, Region 4, The series was released on 9 August 2006. It was then re-release as "The Complete Series" on 20 August 2014.

Episodes

References

External links

 Comedy Guide

Clarence at the British Film Institute

1980s British sitcoms
1988 British television series debuts
1988 British television series endings
BBC television sitcoms
English-language television shows
Period television series